Ward Raymond Bliss (December 15, 1855 - January 6, 1905) was an American politician from Pennsylvania who served as a Republican member of the Pennsylvania House of Representatives for Delaware County from 1889 to 1906 and as Majority Leader from 1903 to 1904.

Early life and education
Bliss was born in Lewisburg, Pennsylvania.  He graduated from Bucknell University in 1874 and was a member of the Sigma Chi fraternity.

Career
In 1874, Bliss moved to Chester, Pennsylvania.  He worked as a teacher while studying law and was admitted to the Delaware County bar in 1878.

In 1881, Bliss began publishing a weekly legal journal, of which 5 volumes were published in book form under the title "The Delaware County Reports".  He also published a "Digest of the Local Laws of Delaware County".

In 1882, Bliss became owner and editor of the Delaware County Republican newspaper in Chester, Pennsylvania and continued in that capacity until 1893.

He worked as Chair of the Delaware County Republican Committee in 1887 and was elected to the Pennsylvania House of Representatives for Delaware County defeating Albert Magnin in 1889.  Bliss was re-elected to serve 8 consecutive terms, served as chairman of the committee of appropriations and as Majority Leader from 1903-1904.

Bliss died in office and his vacancy was filled by Crosby M. Black.

Personal life
Bliss died in Philadelphia, Pennsylvania and is interred at the Lewisburg Cemetery in Lewisburg, Pennsylvania.

References

External links

1855 births
1905 deaths
19th-century American newspaper editors
19th-century American politicians
20th-century American politicians
Bucknell University alumni
Burials in Pennsylvania
Editors of Pennsylvania newspapers
Republican Party members of the Pennsylvania House of Representatives
Pennsylvania lawyers